Cape Verdean Olympic Committee (IOC code: CPV) is the National Olympic Committee representing Cape Verde.

See also
 Cape Verde at the Olympics

References

Cape Verde
Cape Verde at the Olympics